Fujiwara no Kiyoko (藤原 聖子; 1122–1182) later Kōkamon'in (皇嘉門院), was an Empress consort of Japan. She was the consort of Emperor Sutoku of Japan. She was the daughter of Fujiwara Tadamichi.

In 1156 she ordained as a Buddhist nun and received the Dharma name Seijōe (清浄恵). In 1164 she renewed her ordination and received the name Rengaku (蓮覚).

Notes

Fujiwara clan
Japanese empresses
1122 births
1182 deaths
Emperor Sutoku
Japanese Buddhist nuns
12th-century Buddhist nuns